Joe Tyler (born January 20, 1948) is an American bobsledder. He competed in the two man and the four man events at the 1980 Winter Olympics.

References

External links
 

1948 births
Living people
American male bobsledders
Olympic bobsledders of the United States
Bobsledders at the 1980 Winter Olympics
Bobsledders from Chicago